David A. Chandler is a former Associate Justice of the Supreme Court of Mississippi. He is a former justice of the Mississippi Court of Appeals, and a graduate of the University of Mississippi School of Law.  He stepped down on December 7, 2015, to become the director of Mississippi's foster care system under the Division of Family and Children's Services.

References

External links

Justices of the Mississippi Supreme Court
Mississippi Court of Appeals judges
University of Mississippi School of Law alumni
Living people
Methodists from Mississippi
Year of birth missing (living people)